Trèves-Cunault is a former town in the department of Maine-et-Loire, France that existed from 1839 to 1973. It was originally created in 1839 by the merger of the towns of Trèves and Cunault. In 1973, it was merged with the town of Chênehutte-les-Tuffeaux to form the new town of Chênehutte-Trèves-Cunault.

See also
Communes of the Maine-et-Loire department

References

Trevescunault